Good Hope Primary Hospital is a government-run district hospital located in Good Hope, Botswana.

References

External links 
Botswana Ministry of Health 

Hospitals in Botswana